Cryptomonadales is an order of Cryptophyta containing the families Cryptomonadaceae and Hilleaceae.

References

Cryptomonads
Bikont orders